Kerim Uras (born 6 June 1963, Ankara, Turkey) is a Turkish diplomat and Ambassador. He is the Turkish ambassador to Canada.

Biography 
He attended Ankara Tevfik Fikret High School and around 1985 he graduated from the Ankara University in the Faculty of International Relations. He finished his Master's degree from the University of Ankara. He started working at the Ministry of Foreign Affairs in 1985 and held various positions in the ministry. In 2010, he was assigned to the Tel Aviv Embassy, he was unable to resume duty due to the Gaza flotilla raid but served as the Turkish ambassador to Greece between 8 December 2011 and 14 October 2016. Between 30 November 2016 and July 2018, he served as Prime Minister Binali Yıldırım's Chief foreign policy advisor.

He has also been a member of the Foreign Policy Advisory Board along with his post of chief advisor to Prime Minister Binali Yıldırım.

References 

Living people
1963 births
People from Ankara
21st-century Turkish diplomats
Ankara University alumni
Ambassadors of Turkey to Greece